Guntersville Dam is a hydroelectric dam on the Tennessee River in Marshall County, in the U.S. state of Alabama. It is one of nine dams on the river owned and operated by the Tennessee Valley Authority, which built the dam in the late 1930s as part of a New Deal era initiative to create a continuous navigation channel on the entire length of the river and bring flood control and economic development to the region.

The city is named for its first settler, John Gunter (d. 1836), who arrived in the late 18th century.

Location
The reservoir's backwaters have formed embayments on the lower parts of Browns Creek and Spring Creek to the west and east of the city of Guntersville, respectively, effectively placing the city at the tip of a long peninsula.

Capacity

Guntersville Dam is serviced by a  navigation lock. The dam's original  lock is now used as an auxiliary lock.

Background and construction

In the early 1900s, the U.S. Army Corps of Engineers investigated several possible dam sites in the Guntersville vicinity in hopes of  flooding a significant stretch of the river upstream from the city, which had unreliable water levels and had long been an impediment to major navigation in the upper Tennessee Valley. More extensive investigations in the 1920s identified several more sites, including the present dam site, which they called the Coles Bend Bar site. After the Tennessee Valley Authority was formed in 1933, the Authority assumed control of all navigation and flood control projects in the Tennessee Valley. In 1935, TVA followed up the Army Corps investigations, deeming a dam at Guntersville necessary to extend the navigation channel beyond Wheeler Lake, which at that time was under construction. Guntersville Dam was authorized November 27, 1935, and construction began a few days later on December 4.

A large dike was built to protect the city of Guntersville from reservoir backwaters, and substantial dredging was necessary to extend the navigable  channel up to Hales Bar Dam (this dam has since been dismantled and replaced by Nickajack Dam, shortening Guntersville Lake).

Guntersville Dam was completed on January 17, 1939, constructed at a cost of $51 million.  The dam's lock was designed by the Army Corps of Engineers and went into operation on January 24, 1939.  The dam's first generator went online August 8, 1939.  The hydroelectric project's components were listed on the National Register of Historic Places in 2016.

See also

Dams and reservoirs of the Tennessee River
List of crossings of the Tennessee River
List of Alabama dams and reservoirs

References

External links

Guntersville Reservoir (TVA site)

Dams on the Tennessee River
Dams in Alabama
Buildings and structures in Marshall County, Alabama
Hydroelectric power plants in Alabama
Tennessee Valley Authority dams
Huntsville-Decatur, AL Combined Statistical Area
Dams completed in 1939
Energy infrastructure completed in 1939
National Register of Historic Places in Marshall County, Alabama
Dams on the National Register of Historic Places in Alabama